Tropidonophis dendrophiops, the spotted water snake, is a species of colubrid snake. It is found in the Philippines.

References

Tropidonophis
Reptiles of the Philippines
Reptiles described in 1883
Taxa named by Albert Günther